Luna Rossa Prada Pirelli, originally named Prada Challenge, then Luna Rossa Challenge, is an Italian sailboat racing syndicate first created to compete for the 2000 America's Cup. It won the Louis Vuitton Cup on their first attempt in 2000, but then lost the America's Cup match against the defending champion team, Team New Zealand.

Luna Rossa challenged again for the 2003 America's Cup but was knocked out in the semi-finals stage of the Louis Vuitton Cup. In the 2007 America's Cup, held in Valencia, Spain, the team reached the final of the Louis Vuitton Cup but was again defeated by Team New Zealand.

When the competition moved to AC72 catamarans for the 2013 America's Cup, held in San Francisco, Luna Rossa was the last team to challenge, entering a partnership with Team New Zealand. The Italian team reached the final of the Louis Vuitton Cup, losing to the Kiwi team. While Luna Rossa planned to participate in the 2017 America's Cup, setting up a new base in Cagliari and starting development on the new boat, it withdrew from the competition in protest of the decision to switch class of yachts to the AC50 catamaran.

After Team New Zealand won the Cup back in 2017, Luna Rossa issued their challenge for the next edition, becoming the Challenger of Record for the 2021 America's Cup.

The team is owned by Prada CEO Patrizio Bertelli and it is sponsored by that Italian fashion brand. Additional sponsors were Telecom Italia between 2005 and 2007 and Pirelli from 2018.

History

1997–2000: The first challenge
In February 1997, Prada CEO and avid sailor Patrizio Bertelli met with Argentinian yacht designer German Frers to discuss the construction of a cruising yacht. Frers asked suddenly "Why don’t we consider the America’s Cup?". Within 15 days, the core group behind Luna Rossa's first America's Cup campaign was established; the team challenged for the 30th America's Cup on behalf of the Yacht Club Punta Ala and under the name Prada Challenge.

Starting from October 1999 in Auckland, New Zealand, the team raced in the 2000 Louis Vuitton Cup with its two IACC yachts ITA-45 and ITA-48 (the latter only for the first two Round Robins) skippered by Francesco de Angelis. After ranking first in the Round Robin stage by winning 26 out of 29 races, and first again in the knock out stage after winning 8 out of 10, Luna Rossa disputed the finals against AmericaOne, skippered by Paul Cayard. In a long battle across 9 races, Luna Rossa ultimately prevailed 5-4, winning the Louis Vuitton Cup on 6 February 2000, the second time ever for an Italian team after Il Moro di Venezia in 1992.

Having earned the right to challenge for the 2000 America's Cup, Luna Rossa lost 5–0 to defending Cup champion Team New Zealand.

2001–2003: The second challenge
Luna Rossa was the first to issue a challenge to Team New Zealand for the 31st America's Cup and therefore contested the 2003 Louis Vuitton Cup as the Challenger of Record.  The team built two new IACC yachts, ITA-74 and ITA-80, which did not perform as expected. Still skippered by Francesco de Angelis, Luna Rossa was eliminated in the semi-final stage by American team OneWorld.

2004–2007: The third challenge
After Alinghi's victory in the 2003 America's Cup, the competition moved to Valencia, Spain, for the first time ever in Europe. Luna Rossa was the first of the 12 participating teams to set up a base in Valencia, with a restructured team compared to the previous two campaigns. Now competing as Luna Rossa Challenge with Telecom Italia as an additional sponsor, the team challenged on behalf of the Yacht Club Italiano, based in Genoa, one of the oldest yacht club in the Mediterranean. The sailing team was enriched with new members, most notably Jimmy Spithill as helmsman, while Francesco de Angelis remained skipper.

The team built two new IACC yachts for the campaign, ITA-86 and ITA-94, the latter of which raced in the 2007 Louis Vuitton Cup. After ranking third in the Round Robin stage, winning 16 out of 20 races, the team beat BMW Oracle Racing 5-1 in the semi-finals. Luna Rossa then lost 5-0 in the Louis Vuitton Cup finals against Emirates Team New Zealand.

2007–2011: The Cup on a hiatus
With the extensive court challenges leading to the 2010 America's Cup, there was no Louis Vuitton Cup competition planned for several years.  During this period, Luna Rossa Challenge joined other teams racing  IACC yachts in the 2009 Louis Vuitton Pacific Series and in the 2010 Louis Vuitton Trophy, La Maddalena event.

Furthermore, the team remained active racing in the Maxi yacht circuit in 2008 and 2009 with an STP 65' yacht, skippered by Robert Scheidt, and raced in the Audi MedCup in 2010 with a TP52 yacht.

In 2011, Luna Rossa joined the Extreme Sailing Series, racing for the first time in catamarans. During this series, Luna Rossa was skippered for the first time by Max Sirena, who had been mid-bowman in Luna Rossa's previous three America's Cup campaigns and had a key role as wing mast manager for BMW Oracle Racing's trimaran USA-17 that won the 2010 America's Cup. Luna Rossa won the 2011 Extreme Sailing Series at its first and only participation in the circuit.

2011–2013: The fourth challenge
In October 2011, Luna Rossa challenged for the 34th America's Cup on behalf of the Circolo della Vela Sicilia, based in Palermo. Luna Rossa Challenge were last to enter the event, which was to be contested with a new class of yachts, the AC72 catamarans.

The team bought two AC45 catamarans to get the team up to speed with multihulls and compete in the newly developed America's Cup World Series. The two boats, called Piranha and Swordfish, raced for the first time at the event in Naples between 11–15 April 2012 and were helmed by British sailors Chris Draper and Paul Campbell-James but with a primarily Italian crew, including skipper Max Sirena and Francesco Bruni as wing trimmer. 'Luna Rossa Piranha' went on to win the overall 2012/2013 season of the America's Cup World Series, following the disqualification of Oracle Team USA.

In order to overcome the late start in the 2013 America's Cup campaign, a deal was signed with Emirates Team New Zealand to share information on the design of their AC72 catamarans. Luna Rossa constructed only one AC72, which was launched in Auckland in October 2012. Luna Rossa's catamaran was characterised by a unique chrome livery.

Luna Rossa ranked second in the Round Robin stage of the 2013 Louis Vuitton Cup, with 4 losses against Emirates Team New Zealand and 4 forfeit wins against Artemis Racing, who did not participate in the first stage of the competition after a disastrous capsize. Then, Luna Rossa contested the semi-finals against the Swedish team, easily winning 4-0.

Luna Rossa and Emirates Team New Zealand ended up facing each other in the challengers’ final, which the kiwi team won 7–1.

2013–2017: A challenge withdrawn
In June 2014, Luna Rossa confirmed they would compete for the 2017 Louis Vuitton Cup, which was to be contested in AC62 catamarans. The team set up a new base in Cagliari and started development on the new boat.

In April 2015, before the preliminary 2015–16 America's Cup World Series started competition, it was decided that the 2017 America's Cup would switch to a smaller class of yacht, the AC50 catamaran, without the unanimous consent of all competitors. Luna Rossa Challenge, which was already in an advanced design stage for a yacht according to the original rule, withdrew in protest.

Following Luna Rossa's withdrawal, the team lent resources and key personnel to Emirates Team New Zealand in their effort to win the Cup against current defender Oracle Team USA. Most notably, Luna Rossa skipper and team director Max Sirena joined the kiwi team in a management role. As soon as Emirates Team New Zealand won the 35th America's Cup on 26 June 2017, Luna Rossa challenged the kiwi team on behalf of the Circolo della Vela Sicilia and became the Challenger of Record for the 36th America's Cup.

2017–2021: Return to New Zealand
Now branded as Luna Rossa Prada Pirelli following the addition of sponsor Pirelli, the team organised and participated in the 2021 Prada Cup, due to its position as Challenger of Record. The competition returned to monohulls with the establishment of a new class of foiling yachts, the AC75. Luna Rossa's operations initially took place in their base in Cagliari, Sardinia, where the team's first AC75 yacht was launched in October 2019, and moved to Auckland in September 2020, where they launched a second AC75 in October 2020.

The Italian sailboat raced in the 2021 Prada Cup with a unique dual helmsmen configuration, with Jimmy Spithill on starboard and Francesco Bruni on port, while skipper Max Sirena stayed off the boat. Luna Rossa ranked second in the Round Robin phase and then beat American Magic 4-0 in the semi-finals. In the 2021 Prada Cup final the team won 7-1 against Ineos Team UK, earning the right to challenge for the 2021 America's Cup.

Facing defender Emirates Team New Zealand, Luna Rossa managed to win one point on each of the first three days of the competition, after which the two teams were tied 3-3. Nevertheless, the defender eventually prevailed and won the 2021 America's Cup with the score 7-3.

Results

The boats
A total of 9 boats have been built for America's Cup campaigns, all named Luna Rossa. Of these, two won the Challenger selection series and went on to officially challenge for the America's Cup (in 2000 and in 2021), both times losing to the defender Team New Zealand. Two more reached the challenger selection series final (in 2007 and 2013), losing to again to Team New Zealand on both occasions.

Since the 2007 America's Cup, all Luna Rossa boats have been built by Persico Marine in Nembro, Italy.

Notable sailors
Francesco de Angelis – Skipper (2000, 2003 and 2007)
Max Sirena – Mid-bowman (2000, 2003 and 2007), Skipper (2013 and 2021)
Francesco Bruni – Afterguard (2003 and 2007), Tactician (2013), Helmsman (2021)
James Spithill – Helmsman (2007 and 2021)
Chris Draper – Helmsman (2013)
Torben Grael – Tactician (2000, 2003 and 2007)
Gilberto Nobili – Grinder (2003, 2007), Operations Manager (2021)
Matteo Plazzi – Navigator (2000, 2003, 2007)
Pietro Sibello – Wing trimmer (2021)
Philippe Presti – Coach (2007 and 2021)

See also
 Italy at the America's Cup

References

External links
 

1999 establishments in Italy
Prada
Luna Rossa Challenge